Miss Supranational 2018 was the 10th anniversary of Miss Supranational pageant. It was held on December 7, 2018 at MOSIR Arena in Krynica-Zdrój, Poland. Jenny Kim of Korea crowned Valeria Vázquez Latorre of Puerto Rico at the end of the event.

Contestants from 72 countries and territories competed in this year's Miss Supranational pageant, The pageant was hosted by Maciej Dowbor and Iwan Podriez.

Background
On August 17, 2018, The organization of Miss Supranational is delighted to announce that the 10th Anniversary edition of the finals of Miss Supranational 2018 would be held on Friday 7 December at MOSIR Arena in the beautiful mountain resort of Krynica-Zdroj in Poland.

Placements

Continental Queens of Beauty

Judges
On the occasion 10th anniversary of the competition, all winners were originally Judges. However, for personal reasons, Monika Lewczuk - Miss Supranational 2011 and Stephania Vásquez Stegman - Miss Supranational 2015 can't attend.
 Gerhard Parzutka von Lipinski – President of the Miss Supranational Organization
 Oksana Moria – Miss Supranational 2009
 Karina Pinilla Corro – Miss Supranational 2010
 Katarzyna Krzeszowska – 4th Runner-up Miss Supranational 2014
 Ekaterina Buraya – Miss Supranational 2012
 Mutya Johanna Datul – Miss Supranational 2013
 Asha Bhat – Miss Supranational 2014
 Srinidhi Ramesh Shetty – Miss Supranational 2016
 Jenny Kim – Miss Supranational 2017

Special awards

Top Model

Contestants
72 contestants competed for the title.
{| class="wikitable sortable" style="font-size: 95%;"
|-
! Country/Territory !! Contestant !! Age !! Hometown !! Continental Group
|-
| Albania||Alba Bajram||18||Elbasan||Europe
|-
| Argentina||Lali Dieguez||19||Buenos Aires||Americas
|-
| Australia||Maddison Clare||25||Sydney||Oceania
|-
| Belarus||Margarita Martynova||22||Minsk||Europe
|-
| Belgium||Dhenia Covens||25||Antwerp||Europe 
|-
| Bolivia||Ilseen Olmos Ferrufino||27||La Paz||Americas
|-
| Brazil||Bárbara Reis||20||Sinop||Americas
|-
| Canada||Alyssa Boston||23||Tecumseh||Americas 
|-
| China||Gao Ziqian||19||Beijing||Asia
|-
| Colombia||Miriam Carranza De Moya||23||Barranquilla||Americas
|-
| Costa Rica||Marianella Chase||27||San José||Americas
|-
| Croatia||Tihana Babij Guliing||18||Zagrzeb||Europe
|-
| Czech Republic||Jana Šišková||23||Zubří||Europe
|-
| Denmark||Celina Riel||18||Copenhagen||Europe
|-
| Dominican Republic||Yomaira de Luna||22||Toledo||Caribbean
|-
| Ecuador||Carla Del Prado||24||Guayaquil||Americas
|-
| El Salvador||Katia Mekhi Lobos||28||San Salvador||Americas
|-
| England||Romy Simpkins||24||London||Europe
|-
| Equatorial Guinea||Maria Lucrecia Nve Maleva||19||Malabo||Africa
|-
| Finland||Eveliina Tikka||23||Helsinki||Europe
|-
| France||Sonia Mansour||25||Paris||Europe
|-
| Greece||Maria Psilou||21||Aigio||Europe
|-
| Guadeloupe||Daveline Nanette||27||Basse-Terre||Caribbean
|-
| Guatemala||Stephanie Ogaldez||21||Guatemala City||Americas
|-
| Haiti||Mideline Phelizor||23||Port-au-Prince||Caribbean
|-
| Hungary||Patricia Galambos||21||Budapest||Europe
|-
| Italy||Rosa Fariello||23||Apulia||Europe
|-
| India||Aditi Hundia||21||Jaipur||Asia
|-
| Indonesia||Wilda Octaviana Situngkir||22||Pontianak||Asia
|-
| Jamaica ||Tonille Simone Watkis||27||Kingston||Caribbean
|-
| Japan||Yurika Nakamoto||23||Okinawa||Asia
|-
| Kenya||Ivy Marani||24||Bungoma||Africa
|-
| Korea||Lee Eun-bi||26||Gyeonggi||Asia
|-
| Laos||Santhany Saimanyvan||25||Vientiane||Asia
|-
| Lebanon||Natalie Macdisi||24||Tripoli||Asia
|-
| Malaysia||Sanjna Suri||27||Batu Caves||Asia
|-
| Malta||Natalia Galea||20||Birkirkara||Europe
|-
| Mauritius||Anoushka Ah keng	||24||Rodrigues||Africa
|-
| Mexico||Diana Romero||26||Mazatlán||Americas
|-
| Myanmar|| Shwe Eain Si||20||Yangon||Asia
|-
|  Moldova ||Nicoleta Căun||22||Chișinău||Europe
|-
|  Montenegro ||Sandra Rešetar||22||Podgorica||Europe
|-
|  Namibia ||Ndilyowike Haipinge	||26||Windhoek||Africa 
|-
|  Nepal ||Mahima Singh||23||Kathmandu||Asia
|-
|  Netherlands ||Kelly van den Dungen||25||Amsterdam||Europe 
|-
|  New Zealand||Johannah Charlotte||25||Wellington||Oceania
|- 
| Nigeria||Daniella Orumwense||25||Edo||Africa
|-
| Pakistan||Anzhelika Tahir||24||Karachi||Asia
|-
| Panama||Keythlin Saavedra||18||Panama city||Americas
|-
| Paraguay||Ana Paula Cespedes||20||Asunción||Americas
|-
| Philippines||Jehza Mae Huelar||23|| Davao City||Asia
|-
| Poland||Magdalena Bieńkowska||25||Warsaw||Europe
|-
| Portugal||Claudia Maia||21|||Lamas||Europe
|-
| Puerto Rico||Valeria Vázquez Latorre||24||San Juan||Caribbean|-
| Romania||Andreea Coman||25||Bucharest||Europe
|-
| Russia||Guzaliya Izmailova||22||Saint Petersburg||Asia
|-
| Rwanda||Tina Uwase Ngaceng||24||Kigali||Africa
|-
| Singapore||Priyanka Annuncia||21||Singapore||Asia
|-
| Slovakia||Katarina Oeovanova|| 21||Hriňová||Europe
|-
| Slovenia||Mersedes Viler Zdzarsky|| 27||Ljubljana||Europe 
|-
| South Africa||Belinde Schreuder||22||Johannesburg||Africa 
|-
| Spain||Teresa Calleja Palazuelo||21||Madrid||Europe
|-
| Suriname||Shamira Nadine Jap||22||Paramaribo||Caribbean
|-
| Sweden||Jenny Wulff||22||Stockholm||Europe
|-
| Switzerland||Amelia Giannarelli||20||Collombey-Muraz||Europe
|-
| Thailand||Pinnarat Mawinthon||27||Nan||Asia
|-
| Togo||Yasmin Iman Salou||25||Lomé||Africa
|-
| Turkey||Roda Irmak Kalkan||18||Istanbul||Asia
|-
| Ukraine||Snizhana Tanchuk||27||Lviv||Europe
|-
| United States||Katrina Jayne Dimaranan||25||Union City||Americas
|-
| Venezuela||Nariman Cristina Battikha Yanyi||24||Maturín||Americas
|-
| Vietnam||Nguyễn Minh Tú||27||Ho Chi Minh City||Asia
|-
|}

Notes
Debuts
  Returns
Last competed in 2012:
 Last competed in 2013:
   Last competed in 2014:
   Last competed in 2015:
  Last competed in 2016:
          Withdrawals

             '''

References

External links 
 

2018
2018 beauty pageants